Adolf Foehr (20 June 1880, in Nuremberg – 7 October 1943, in Prague) was a Bohemian German architect, city planner, and building supervisor.

Life and work 
He grew up in Annaberg-Buchholz, and moved with his parents from there to Prague, while still a boy. From 1899 to 1902, he attended the master classes there; taught by Jan Kotěra. He continued his studies at ETH Zürich, while continuing to take part in exhibitions in Prague. In 1908, he opened his architectural office in the Holešovice district.

His first credited projects are from around 1910; in the Art Nouveau style. Later, he turned to Purism. His buildings are adorned with canopies, risalits and arches. He also made extensive use of materials such as marble, brass and travertine. He often employed three-part windows and triangular floor plans. In the 1930s, he changed styles again; favoring Constructivism. 

Overall, he designed more than fifty commercial and residential buildings in Prague; most of which were created for ethnic German companies. This focus often led to his being passed over by Czech organizations. For example, in 1926 he won first place in a competition to design an expansion of the Prague City Council's offices, but his designs were never used.

Despite this, from 1921, he was a technical advisor for the Building Commission and, after 1924, a Building Department official.

Selected buildings

References

Further reading 
 Zdeněk Lukeš: Begleichung der Schuld: Deutschsprachige Architekten in Prag 1900–1938, pp. 42–52, Fraktály Publishers, 2002 
 Pavel Vlček: Encyklopedie architektů, stavitelů, zedníků a kameníků v Čechách, pp.178–179, Academia, 2004 
 Jaroslav Zeman: "Palác Dunaj – První výšková budova v Liberci a její tvůrce", pp.6–22 in Památky Libereckého Kraje 2010–2011, Národní Památkový Ústav, 2011.  (Online)

External links 

 Adolf Foehr @ Liberec-Reichenberg

1880 births
1943 deaths
Czechoslovak architects
German Bohemian people
ETH Zurich alumni
Architects from Nuremberg
German emigrants to Austria-Hungary